Dargin writing is a written form of communication representing the North East Caucasian Dargin language. This language has approximately 439,000 speakers, most of whom live in the Russian republic of Dagestan. Additionally, Dargin writing is used in the Russian Republics of Kalmykia, Khantia-Mansia, and Chechnya, as well as nearby countries of Azerbaijan, Kazakhstan, Kyrgyzstan,
Turkey, Turkmenistan, Ukraine, and Uzbekistan.

History 
The Arabic alphabet was adapted as the Dargin phonetics alphabet in 1920, but it was poorly adapted to the sounds of the Dargin language. So in 1928, as part of the All-Union project on Romanization, the Latin-based alphabet was adopted for Dargin. In the same year, the first primer in this alphabet was published (cupanov r. Nuşala ʐaꝗ-sawet. Mәħәc-qala, 1928). Initially the Dargin Romanized alphabet had no capital letters. After the reform of 1932 capital letters were introduced, some Latin letters were excluded and the alphabet took the form shown in the table:

Modern alphabet 
The Cyrillic alphabet was adopted in 1938. In the 1960s, the letter ПI, пI was added.

References 
 Appendix:Cyrillic script
 Dargin language 
 Dargwa basic lexicon at the Global Lexicostatistical Database

Specific

Northeast Caucasian languages
Languages of Russia
Dagestan